George Nonomura (born February 5, 1958) is an American fencer. He competed in the team foil event at the 1988 Summer Olympics.

References

External links
 

1958 births
Living people
American male foil fencers
Olympic fencers of the United States
Fencers at the 1988 Summer Olympics
Fencers from San Francisco